Akaigawa Caldera (赤井川カルデラ, Akaigawa karudera) is a caldera located in Hokkaido Prefecture, Japan. It was active anywhere between 1.7 and 1.3 million years ago.

See also
 List of volcanoes in Japan
 Akaigawa, Hokkaido

References

External links 
 Akaigawa Caldera - Geological Survey of Japan

Volcanoes of Hokkaido
Calderas of Hokkaido
Pleistocene calderas